Bruce Kirby (born Bruno Giovanni Quidaciolu; April 28, 1925 – January 24, 2021) was an American character actor.

Career 
Bruce Kirby started his television career in the 1950s with appearances in Goodyear Television Playhouse. During the 1960s, he appeared in I Dream of Jeannie, The Nurses, The Defenders, Car 54, Where Are You? (in 9 episodes), Hogan's Heroes (in 3 episodes), and The Patty Duke Show among others. He played in Bonanza (in 3 episodes), Ironside (in 3 episodes), Barney Miller (in 3 episodes), The Rockford Files (in 3 episodes), The Marcus-Nelson Murders, Kojak (in 6 episodes), M*A*S*H and Alice during the 1970s. In the 1980s, he appeared in Remington Steele, Hunter (in 5 episodes), Night Court, Matlock, Hill Street Blues, Lou Grant and Punky Brewster. His 1990s television credits include The Golden Girls, L.A. Law, In the Heat of the Night, Murphy Brown, Murder, She Wrote (in 2 episodes) and Chicago Hope. During 1999-2000 he appeared in 8 episodes of the soap opera Days of Our Lives. During the 2000s, he appeared in The Sopranos, The Agency, Scrubs and The West Wing.

Kirby appeared a total of 9 times in the long-running series Columbo, most notably in the role as the gullible Sergeant Kramer in 6 episodes. In 1981–1982, he appeared as San Francisco police officer Schmidt in the crime drama Shannon. He played the part of District Attorney Bruce Rogoff in 13 episodes of L.A. Law from 1986 until 1991. He also played minor roles in some films, including the film classics Catch-22 (1970) and Stand by Me (1986). He also appeared in the 1971 movie called How to Frame a Figg with Don Knotts and the 1972 comedy Another Nice Mess with Rich Little. A notable later appearance was as Pop Ryan, father of Officer John Ryan (played by Matt Dillon) in the 2005 film Crash. Bruce Kirby was also active as an actor on New York's Broadway, appearing in Diamond Orchid (1965) and Death of a Salesman (1984).

Personal life 
Kirby had two sons, including Bruno Kirby (1949–2006) who was also an actor. Bruno appeared in one Columbo with Kirby as Cadet Morgan (credited as B. Kirby, jr) in By Dawn's Early Light

Kirby died in Los Angeles on January 24, 2021, at the age of 95.

Filmography

Film

Television

References

External links
 
 

1925 births
2021 deaths
20th-century American male actors
21st-century American male actors
American male stage actors
American male film actors
American male television actors
American people of Italian descent
Male actors from New York City